Malayankunju is a 2022 Indian Malayalam-language Drama thriller film directed by Sajimon Prabhakar and written by Mahesh Narayanan.  It stars Fahadh Faasil in the lead role and features Rajisha Vijayan, Indrans, Jaffar Idukki and Deepak Parambol in supporting roles. Along with the script Mahesh Narayanan handles the cinematography and Arju Benn edits the film. The music of the film is composed by A. R. Rahman.

Plot
Anikkuttan is a service mechanic who repairs all electronic devices from home. He is not mentally stable after his father Radhakrishnan hung himself to death when Anikkuttan's sister Sandhya eloped with her lover Deepu on the night before her wedding. Anikkuttan hates his sister and refuses to talk or even let his mother go there. The reason for the hate is not just his father's death, but also that Deepu, Sandhya's husband is from a lower caste. Anikkuttan hates his neighbor Suni for the same reason and has frequent fights with them when Suni's newborn daughter cries in the middle of the night and disturbs Anikkuttan's sleep.

Govt gives public service announcements that everyone should move to shelter homes. Anikkuttan refuses to go stating that it's just a publicity stunt from govt and that he has to share amenities with other castes. Anikkuttan gets an invite for Suni's baby's 28th day ceremony. There Anikkuttan gets particularly upset because his mom gifts a gold bangle to Suni's kid without asking him and that makes his relationship with Suni's family worse. That night, the rain gets worse and Suni and his family decide to move to a shelter home but Ani refuses to go and says he will stay back with his mom. But soon after Anikkuttan goes to bed, a landslide happens in that area and Anikkuttan gets trapped under the soil.

He becomes unconscious and is underwater when his dad comes into his dream and rescues him and tells him people are divided by caste only until death, after which all are forever sleeping equally in the soil. He asks to him save the baby whose cries can be heard. Anikkuttan regains consciousness and fights back his way up. He calls the names of Suni, his mom, and others but no one responds. Suddenly he hears the sound of Ponni, Suni's baby daughter and he frantically searches for her. He finds the dead body of Divakaran on the way. He finally manages to find the baby and hold her close before the rescuers find them and take them to the hospital. All others' lives are lost.

At the hospital, Sandhya and Deepu come to help Anikkuttan. He slowly walks towards the children's ICU and finds Ponni there. He happily accepts Ponni as his daughter as she is the only one left for him.

Cast

Production
Mahesh Narayanan, who had previously worked with Fahadh in Take Off, C U Soon and Mālik approached Fazil with the story. Fazil liked the story and agreed to bankroll the film. Also, Sajimon Prabhakar, who worked as associate director in the films Ente Ummante Peru and Android Kunjappan Version 5.25, was confirmed as the director. Rajisha Vijayan was opted in to play the female lead opposite Fahadh.

Principal photography began on 28 January 2021 at Aruvithura following COVID-19 protocols. Filming continued in different locations at Aruvithura and Ernakulam and finished the first schedule after 26 days shoot. During the second schedule, while filming a stunt scene on 2 March 2021, Fahadh fell from a height, suffered a nose injury and underwent a surgery next day. Sushin Shyam was selected as the music composer. However, he was replaced by A. R. Rahman.

Music

The original songs and background score were composed by A. R. Rahman. The first single "Cholappenne" sung by Vijay Yesudas was released on 12 July 2022, the second title "Mannum Niranje" sung by Swetha Mohan was released on 19 July 2022 and the third song "Ponni Makale" sung by Padma Bhushan Dr. K. S. Chithra, is just a film version & not included in the album.

References

External links
 

2020s Malayalam-language films
Indian survival films
Films scored by A. R. Rahman
2022 thriller films